2000–01 Croatian First A League was the 11th season of the Croatian handball league since its independence and the first season of the First League format. The title was won by the green table.

League table

Relegation play-offs 
The league was played by a single-round league system, consisting of the three last placed teams of the First League and three top placed teams of the Second League. The first three teams have been eligible for the 2002-03 Croatian First League.

Sources 
 Fredi Kramer, Dražen Pinević: Hrvatski rukomet = Croatian handball, Zagreb, 2009.; page 179
 Petar Orgulić: 50 godina rukometa u Rijeci, Rijeka, 2005; page 278

References

2001-02
handball
handball
Croatia